The Party of Development and Reforms (PDR), sometimes seen as the Party of Reforms and Development, was a political party in Kenya.

It officially changed its name to United Democratic Alliance (UDA) in December 2020.

History
The party was established as the Party of Action (POA) in February 2012 by Hillary Yegon in order to contest the 2013 general elections. It later formed an electoral pact with the Kenya National Congress (KNC) for the 2013 general elections, which was formalised as the Eagle Alliance. The alliance nominated the KNC's Peter Kenneth as its presidential candidate. In the elections Kenneth finished fourth in the presidential contest with 0.6% of the vote. The Party of Action failed to win a parliament, receiving less than 0.05% of the vote.

Prior to the 2017 general elections, the party was renamed. In the elections the PDR endorsed incumbent President Uhuru Kenyatta, also winning four seats in the National Assembly and one in the Senate.

References

2012 establishments in Kenya
Political parties established in 2012
Political parties in Kenya

Political parties disestablished in 2020